Peggy Holmes is an American choreographer, dancer, screenwriter, and film director. Her full-length directorial debut was on 2008's The Little Mermaid: Ariel's Beginning, although she had previously directed a segment of the anthology film Mickey's Twice Upon a Christmas. She later directed Secret of the Wings (2012) and The Pirate Fairy (2014) from the Tinker Bell film series. She uses her choreography skills to bringing life to characters; animated in otherwise. Her choreography credits includes: The Country Bears, The Old Broads, I Love Trouble, Hocus Pocus, Newsies, and The Fabulous Baker Boys. Peggy's choreography was also used though television shows, specifically; for the Pilot Episode of Fame L.A. She appeared in the TV show Hocus Pocus 25th Anniversary Halloween Bash. On January 14, 2020, Peggy Holmes was hired to direct the animated film Luck.

Filmography

Films

Television Series and Specials

Music Video Compilations

References

Year of birth missing (living people)
Living people
American film directors
American animated film directors
American women film directors
American animators
American choreographers
Primetime Emmy Award winners
American women animators
Walt Disney Animation Studios people
Skydance Media people